Emery Dobyns is an American record producer and songwriter, formerly based in Manhattan in New York City, but now based in Nashville.

In late 2021 Dobyns produced and mixed "The Masked Singer EP" for Jewel (singer). He is currently co-producing the forthcoming album from Better Than Ezra.

Recently his songs and productions have been heard on TV shows such as "Lucifer" , American Horror Story, Nancy Drew (2019 TV series), Batwoman (TV series), Virgin River (TV series), Into the Dark (TV series), Grey's Anatomy, Legends of Tomorrow, Sacred Lies, Roswell (TV series), Shades of Blue (TV series) and others. Ad placements include Ford Motor Company and Chromebook.

Selected songs include "Roots" with Morgxn, "Tell That Devil" (featured as the Wynonna Earp (TV series) theme song and on Nashville (2012 TV series)), "Alone Together" (with Jamie Lidell and featured on Grey's Anatomy) and "Hold The Phone" (with Tor Miller.)

Dobyns won a Grammy award for engineering Beauty & Crime by Suzanne Vega.

He has recorded and mixed for the likes of Sia, Lou Reed, Antony & The Johnsons, and Battles. He has produced, recorded and mixed albums by Patti Smith, Noah & The Whale, Travis, Mt. Desolation, Chief, Parlour Tricks, and Fran Healy. Other artists he has worked with include: , Leona Naess, Young Rival, Black Crowes, O.D.B., P. Diddy, Mary J. Blige, and Scarlett Johansson.

He also has several musical projects (with Samuel Dixon) in which he co-writes and sings.

References

External links
 Emery Dobyns on Discogs – Discogs page
 Emery Dobyns on Twitter
 Make & Model on Soundcloud

Living people
Record producers from New York (state)
American audio engineers
Songwriters from New York (state)
Musicians from New York City
People from Manhattan
Year of birth missing (living people)
Engineers from New York (state)